Dierenpark De Oliemeulen (Zoo The Oliemeulen) is a small zoo in Tilburg, Netherlands that describes itself as "the strangest zoo in the Netherlands".

The zoo opened in an old farmhouse in 1987. It was initially just a reptile house, but was expanded in 1992 to include mammals such as monkeys and raccoons, and birds including parrots and birds of prey.

Notes

External links
 (Dutch)

Oliemeulen
Tourist attractions in North Brabant
Buildings and structures in Tilburg